The Gran Criterium is a Group 2 flat horse race in Italy open to two-year-old thoroughbred colts and fillies. It is run at Milan over a distance of 1,500 metres (about 1 mile), and it is scheduled to take place each year in October.

The event held Group 2 status for a period in the 1970s. It was subsequently promoted, and was Italy's only Group 1 race for juvenile horses. It was downgraded back to Group 2 from 2014.

Records
Leading jockey since 1970 (6 wins):
 Gianfranco Dettori – Gay Lussac (1971), El Muleta (1977), Stouci (1978), Pareo (1979), Anguillo (1982), Sikeston (1988)

Leading trainer since 1980 (4 wins):
 John Dunlop – Sanam (1986), Sikeston (1988), Alhijaz (1991), Hello (1996)
 Alduino Botti - Anguillo (1982), Will Dancer (1984), Mission Boy (2018), Vis A Vis (2020)

Leading owner since 1980 (3 wins):
 Prince A. A. Faisal – Sanam (1986), Alhijaz (1991), Nayarra (2011)

Winners since 1980

 The 2008 running was cancelled because of a strike.
 The 2021 races took place at Capannelle.

Earlier winners

 1925: Scopello
 1926: Francavilla
 1927: Erba
 1928: Aruntius
 1929: Gerard
 1930: Alena
 1931: Jacopa del Sellaio
 1932: Dossa Dossi
 1933: Osimo
 1934: Fiume
 1935: Archidamia
 1936: Donatello
 1937: Nearco
 1938: Bautta
 1939: Sabla
 1940: Niccolo dell'Arca
 1941: Donatella
 1943: Liston
 1944: Accorta
 1945: Campiello
 1946: Este
 1947: Trevisana
 1948: Mignard
 1949: Stigliano
 1950: Daumier
 1951: Arson
 1952: Dacia
 1953: Orvieto
 1954: Ribot
 1955: Hidalgo
 1956: Antony
 1957: Pier Capponi
 1958: Rio Marin
 1959: Marguerite Vernaut
 1960: Molvedo
 1961: Olimpio
 1962: Vinteuil
 1963: Crylor
 1964: Tadolina
 1965: Prince Tady
 1966: Amynthas
 1967: Caspoggio
 1968: Toupet
 1969: Viani
 1970: Lascro
 1971: Gay Lussac
 1972: New Model
 1973: Anquetil
 1974: Start
 1975: Northern Spring
 1976: Sirlad
 1977: El Muleta
 1978: Stouci
 1979: Pareo

See also
 List of Italian flat horse races

References

 Racing Post:
 galopp-sieger.de – Gran Criterium.
 horseracingintfed.com – International Federation of Horseracing Authorities – Gran Criterium (2016).
 ippodromimilano.it – Albi d'Oro – Gran Criterium.
 pedigreequery.com – Gran Criterium – Milano San Siro.

Flat horse races for two-year-olds
Horse races in Italy
Sport in Milan